Hellhole is a 1985 women in prison film.

It was distributed by Arkoff International Pictures. Shout Factory cancelled its original plans to release the film on DVD and Blu-Ray due to the film having missing footage, but it has since been released on Blu-Ray in late 2016 by Scream Factory, a subsidiary of Shout Factory.

Plot
After seeing her mother murdered by a killer, Susan, an amnesiac woman, is sent to a mental institution presided over by Dr. Fletcher, a power-crazed female doctor who performs lobotomies on the patients.

Cast
Ray Sharkey – Silk 
Judy Landers – Susan 
Marjoe Gortner – Dr. Dane 
Edy Williams – Vera 
Terry Moore – Sidnee Hammond 
Mary Woronov – Dr. Fletcher 
Richard Cox – Ron 
Robert Z'Dar – Brad 
Cliff Emmich – Dr. Blume 
Martin West – Rollins 
Lynn Borden – Susan's mother 
Dyanne Thorne – Crysta
Marneen Fields – Curry – Girl in dining room

References

External links

1985 films
Women in prison films
1980s English-language films
American prison films
American exploitation films
1980s American films